Francisco Fernández de Béthencourt (27 July 1850 – 2 April 1916), was a Spanish writer, politician and genealogist. He was a member of parliament for Santa Cruz de Tenerife and later a senator at the Cortes on behalf of the conservative party.

He was born at Arrecife, in the Canary Islands, to Francisco-Ramón Fernández-Martínez y Delgado and María de la Concepción de Bethencourt y Mújica.

In 1914, he was admitted into the Royal Spanish Academy. He died 2 years later, 2 April 1916 in Madrid.

References

1850 births
1916 deaths
Members of the Royal Spanish Academy
19th-century male writers